New Gold Dream (81–82–83–84) is the fifth studio album by Scottish band Simple Minds. The album was released in September 1982 by record label Virgin, and was a turning point for the band as they gained critical and commercial success in the UK and Europe.

Origin 
New Gold Dream originated in Simple Minds' unexpected popular and commercial success during an Australian tour with Icehouse following the release of Sons and Fascination. The band was prompted by this experience to write "Promised You a Miracle" upon their return to Europe.

In a 2012 interview, singer Jim Kerr recalled the production of the album as a wonderful time during the late spring and early summer of 1982 in which "everything we tried worked," adding: "There were no arguments. We were in love with what we were doing, playing it, listening to it. You don't get many periods in your life when it all goes your way."

The album was recorded over a five-month period at Rockfield Studio, The Townhouse and Oxford Manor, with preproduction at The Old Mill in Fife. During a short tour rehearsal in January 1982, the band wrote what would become the songs "King Is White and in the Crowd", "Hunter and the Hunted" and "Promised You a Miracle," a song that proved pivotal to the musical direction of the album. It was unveiled in a Kid Jensen session for Radio 1 and released as a single in April 1982.

Producer Peter Walsh was hired on the recommendation of guitarist Charlie Burchill, who had been impressed by Walsh's work on the remix of the band's previous single "Sweat in Bullet." During the recording sessions, Walsh became dissatisfied with Mike Ogletree's drumming, so he recruited session drummer Mel Gaynor for the album. Following Ogletree's departure, Gaynor became a full-time member of the band.

Jazz keyboardist Herbie Hancock guested on the album and plays a synthesizer solo on the song "Hunter and the Hunted."

Release 
Released in September 1982, the album reached #3 on the UK Albums Chart. In the U.S., A&M issued some limited-edition translucent gold with maroon-colored marble vinyl pressings of the album.

The record generated a handful of singles: "Promised You a Miracle" (released in April 1982), "Glittering Prize" (August 1982) and "Someone Somewhere in Summertime" (November 1982). The title track saw a limited release in Italy when the band visited in March 1983.

Virgin Records reissued the album as a remastered edition in 2002 (cardboard vinyl replica edition) and early 2003 (jewel case). On the 2002/2003 edition, the gaps between the tracks on the album are slightly shorter. Virgin also reissued the album on SACD in 2003.

2005 DVD-Audio version 
In 2005, Virgin released a DVD-Audio version that was remixed by Ronald Prent. All of the tracks except "Colours Fly and Catherine Wheel" and "Promised You a Miracle" (for which the multitrack tapes were lost) were remixed in 5.1 surround sound, and a downmixed 2.0 stereo version was created for DVD-Audio setups without surround sound.

The DVD-Audio version contains the bonus track "In Every Heaven," which had previously been lost as it was not labelled properly on the master tape. An instrumental version of the song titled "Soundtrack for Every Heaven" had been the B-side of the "Someone, Somewhere (In Summertime)" 12-inch single and was also included in the Methods of Dance Volume 2 compilation on Virgin. An alternate version of "In Every Heaven" from the same sessions appears in the X5 box set.

2016 box set 
In 2016, Virgin Records issued a six-disc deluxe box set including the original album, single versions, alternative takes and demos, B-sides, 1982 radio sessions and a DVD with the 2005 5.1 mix of the album and performances on Top of the Pops. Virgin also reissued the album as a digital download, a two-CD set, a single CD and a vinyl LP.

Reception 

The album received several positive reviews. In NME, Paul Morley wrote: "My loyalty towards Simple Minds is known to be considerable, yet even I am jarred by the constant beauty of this music. New Gold Dream robs me of my breath." Record Mirror's Mark Cooper wrote: "They have stunned and impressed me but they have rarely moved me. Suddenly, in New Gold Dream, they’ve conquered their fear of feeling and come out shining.”

Journalist David Stubbs places New Gold Dream (81–82–83–84) alongside ABC's The Lexicon of Love and the Associates' Sulk in a group of albums that he describes as the "zenith" of pop music. In a 2016 review in Record Collector, journalist Tom Byford wrote: "New Gold Dream (81-82-83-84) stands shining and singular in the Simple Minds canon... Now it not only takes its place among the greatest future-pop albums of the 80s (Dare, The Lexicon Of Love), it sits comfortably among the greatest pop albums of all time."

The album was included in the book 1001 Albums You Must Hear Before You Die.

When creating their 1984 album The Unforgettable Fire, the Irish rock band U2 saw New Gold Dream as an influence.

In 1998, Jim Kerr said: "Every band or artist with a history has an album that's their holy grail. I suppose New Gold Dream was ours. It was a special time because we were really beginning to break through with that record, both commercially and critically. The people that liked that record connected with it in a special way. There was a depth to it: it created its own mythology. It stood out. It was our most successful record to date and, critically, the Paul Morleys of this world were writing very nice things about it."

Track listing 

Note
The Deluxe Edition consists of disc 1 (The Original Album) and disc 2 (Extended Versions).
The Super Deluxe Edition contains all six discs.

Personnel 
Adapted from the album's liner notes.

Simple Minds
 Jim Kerr – lead vocals
 Charlie Burchill – guitars and effects
 Michael MacNeil – keyboards and effects
 Derek Forbes – bass guitar
 Mike Ogletree – drums (tracks: 2, 5, 6), percussion
 Mel Gaynor – drums (tracks: 1, 4, 6–9)
 Kenny Hyslop – drums (track: 3)

Additional musicians
 Sharon Campbell – girl's voice (tracks: 2, 7)
 Herbie Hancock – keyboard solo (track: 8)

Technical
 Peter Walsh – producer, engineer, arrangements 
 Keith 'Richard' Nixon – tape operator  
 George Chambers – tape operator  
 Francis Xavier Gallagher – tape operator
 Malcolm Garrett, Assorted iMaGes – album sleeve
 Jamie Morgan – photography

Charts

Weekly charts

Year-end charts

Certifications

References

Further reading

External links 
 
*New Gold Dream (81–82–83–84) (Adobe Flash) at Radio3Net (streamed copy where licensed)
Recording New Gold Dream: An Interview with Peter Walsh YouTube

1982 albums
Simple Minds albums
Virgin Records albums
Albums produced by Peter Walsh
Art pop albums